José María Cases Hernández (born 23 November 1986) is a Spanish professional footballer who plays for Orihuela CF as a midfielder.

Club career
Born in Orihuela, Valencian Community, Cases finished his development at Villarreal CF and started competing as a senior with the reserves in Tercera División. He made his professional debut at 16 on 22 June 2003, playing 28 minutes as a substitute for Héctor Font in a 4–1 La Liga home loss to Real Betis; over the next two seasons, he played only three more times for the Yellow Submarine, all off the bench, including once in the 2004–05 edition of the UEFA Cup.

Cases spent the following campaign at Terrassa FC in Segunda División B, before joining his hometown club Orihuela CF also in that level. On 15 June 2008, he signed a two-year deal at Segunda División's SD Eibar on the expiration of his contract, despite having a previous agreement to join UD Salamanca when free. He started in 13 of his appearances for the Basques, who suffered relegation.

Cases subsequently had a year at Valencia CF Mestalla, who fell into the fourth division, before returning to Orihuela. He was bought by Granada CF in summer 2012, being successively loaned to Cádiz CF, CD Mirandés, and CD Alcoyano.

On 22 June 2013, Cases moved abroad for the first time, signing for Panthrakikos F.C. in the Superleague Greece. He switched countries again on 2 August 2015, when he agreed to a two-year deal with K.A.S. Eupen of the Belgian Second Division. On 13 September, four minutes after replacing countryman Víctor Curto, he received a straight red card in an eventual 4–1 home loss to Lierse SK, but his two-match suspension was rescinded on appeal.

On 22 September 2017, 30-year-old Cases joined Doxa Drama F.C. in the Greek second level.

Personal life
Cases' older brother, Manuel, played in the same position for five teams including Orihuela, never any higher than the third tier.

References

External links

1986 births
Living people
People from Orihuela
Sportspeople from the Province of Alicante
Spanish footballers
Footballers from the Valencian Community
Association football midfielders
La Liga players
Segunda División players
Segunda División B players
Tercera División players
Villarreal CF B players
Villarreal CF players
Terrassa FC footballers
Orihuela CF players
SD Eibar footballers
Valencia CF Mestalla footballers
Granada CF footballers
Cádiz CF players
CD Mirandés footballers
CD Alcoyano footballers
Super League Greece players
Football League (Greece) players
Panthrakikos F.C. players
Doxa Drama F.C. players
Belgian Pro League players
Challenger Pro League players
K.A.S. Eupen players
Spain youth international footballers
Spanish expatriate footballers
Expatriate footballers in Greece
Expatriate footballers in Belgium
Spanish expatriate sportspeople in Greece
Spanish expatriate sportspeople in Belgium